Záhoří may refer to places in the Czech Republic:

Záhoří (Jindřichův Hradec District), a municipality and village in the South Bohemian Region
Záhoří (Písek District), a municipality and village in the South Bohemian Region
Záhoří (Semily District), a municipality and village in the Liberec Region
Záhoří (Tábor District), a municipality and village in the South Bohemian Region
Orlické Záhoří, a municipality and village in the Hradec Králové Region

See also
 
Záhorie, Bratislava Region, Slovakia